Schizothyrium pomi is a plant pathogen of the sooty blotch and flyspeck complex, infecting apple, pear and citrus trees and carnations.

 it has been a presumed teleomorph of Zygophiala jamaicensis.

References

External links 
 Index Fungorum
 USDA ARS Fungal Database

Fungal plant pathogens and diseases
Ornamental plant pathogens and diseases
Apple tree diseases
Pear tree diseases
Fungal citrus diseases
Microthyriales